Olivella mandarina is a species of small sea snail, marine gastropod mollusk in the subfamily Olivellinae, in the family Olividae, the olives.  Species in the genus Olivella are commonly called dwarf olives.

Description
The length of the shell attains 12 mm.

Distribution
This marine species occurs off Acapulco, Mexico.

References

 Vervaet F.L.J. (2018). The living Olividae species as described by Pierre-Louis Duclos. Vita Malacologica. 17: 1-111

External links
 Pilsbry, H. A. (1895). Catalogue of the marine shells of Japan with descriptions of new species and notes on others collected by Frederick Stearns. F. Stearns, Detroit, viii + 196 pp, 11 pls

mandarina
Gastropods described in 1835